Somerset Chamber Choir is a choir based in the county of Somerset, England.

The choir was formed in 1984 by former members of Somerset Youth Choir,  and typically gives two concerts annually. Initially, these were mainly around Taunton, but in July 1992 the choir gave it first Wells Cathedral concert. Since 1994, the choir has staged an annual concert with professional orchestra and soloists at Wells Cathedral every summer, with another at King's College Chapel, Taunton earlier in the year, plus occasional other performances around Somerset and beyond, including a trip to Berlin in 2013 when they joined Berliner Kantorei to sing Haydn’s Creation.

Richard Laing has been the choir's musical director since Autumn 2017, succeeding Graham Caldbeck who was in the post for the previous 26 years and is now Conductor Emeritus. Dame Emma Kirkby is Patron of the choir, and has performed with the choir on five occasions, the first being in Bach's St John Passion in King's College Chapel, Taunton in 1988,  and most recently in Bach's Mass in B minor at Wells Cathedral in July 2011.

The choir will next perform at King's College Chapel, Taunton on 16 February 2019, with a collection of music on the subject of love and loss by Brahms, Elgar and Richard Strauss.

See also 
 Wells Cathedral

References

External links 

Richard Laing

English choirs
Musical groups from Somerset
Musical groups established in 1984